Jamsetji Nusserwanji Tata (3 March 1839 – 19 May 1904) was an Indian pioneer industrialist who founded the Tata Group, India's biggest conglomerate company. Named the greatest philanthropist of the last century by several polls and ranking lists, he also established the city of Jamshedpur.

Jamshedji Tata is regarded as the legendary "Father of Indian Industry". He was so influential in the world of industry that Jawaharlal Nehru referred to Tata as a One-Man Planning Commission.

"When you have to give the lead in action, in ideas – a lead which does not fit in with the very climate of opinion – that is true courage, physical or mental or spiritual, call it what you like, and it is this type of courage and vision that Jamshedji Tata showed. It is right that we should honour his memory and remember him as one of the big founders of modern India." —Jawaharlal Nehru
Tata, who in his early life was a merchant, went on to change the business world of India through his many ventures within the cotton and pig iron industry, and is known as one of the most important builders of the modern Indian economy. Out of his many achievements, Tata is particularly notable for the Tata Iron and Steel Works company in Jamshedpur.

Tata was ranked first in the "Hurun Philanthropists of the Century" (2021) by total donations of nearly $102.4 billion with the start of his key endowments way back in 1892.

Early life 
Jamsetji Tata was born to Nusserwanji and Jeevanbai Tata on 3 March 1839 in Navsari, a city in southern Gujarat. His Zoroastrian Parsi family, like many others, found refuge in India, fleeing persecution during the Muslim conquest of Persia. He was born in a respectable, but poor family of priests. His father Nusserwanji, was the first businessman in a family of Parsi Zoroastrian priests. His mother tongue was Gujarati. He broke his family's priestly tradition to become the first member of the family to start a business. He started an export trading firm in Mumbai.

Unlike other Zoroastrians, Jamshedji Tata had a formal Western education because his parents saw that he was gifted with special abilities in mental arithmetic from a young age. However, for him to have a more modern education, he was later sent to Bombay. He joined his father, Nusserwanji, in Bombay at the age of 14 and enrolled at Elphinstone College completing his education as a "Green Scholar" (the equivalent of a graduate). He was married to Hirabai Daboo while still a student.

After graduating from the Elphinstone College in Bombay in 1858, he joined his father's export-trading firm, and helped establish its strong branches in Japan, China, Europe, and the United States. It was a turbulent time to start a business as the Indian Rebellion of 1857 had just been suppressed by the British government. Nusserwanji
Tata regularly travelled to China to become familiar with the opium trade bustling at the time within a small colony of Parsees that was tightly closed off to outsiders.

Nusserwanji Tata wanted his son to be a part of this business, so he sent him to China to learn about the business there and the details about the opium trade. However, when Tata travelled around China, he began to realize that the cotton industry was booming and there was a chance of making a great profit.

Business 

Tata worked in his father's company until he was 29. He founded a trading company in 1868 with 21,000 capital (worth 52 million in 2015 prices). He bought a bankrupt oil mill at Chinchpokli in 1869 and converted it to a cotton mill, which he renamed as Alexandra Mill. He sold the mill 2 years later for a profit. Later, in 1874, Jamsetji Tata floated the Central India Spinning, Weaving, and Manufacturing Company in Nagpur because it seemed like a suitable place for him to establish another business venture. Due to this unconventional location, the people of Bombay scorned Tata for not making the smart move by taking the cotton business up in Bombay, known as the "Cottonopolis" of India. They did not understand why he went to the undeveloped city of Nagpur to start a new business.

However, Tata's selection of Nagpur led to his success. Unlike Bombay, land in Nagpur was cheap and was readily available for resources. There was abundant farm produce, distribution was easy, and the cheap land later led to the converging of railways at Nagpur, which further developed the city. Shortly after, in 1877, Tata established a new cotton mill, "Empress Mill" when Queen Victoria was proclaimed as the Empress of India at 1 January 1877.

He had four goals in life: setting up an iron and steel company, a world-class learning institution, a unique hotel and a hydroelectric plant. Only the hotel became a reality during his lifetime, with the inauguration of the Taj Mahal Hotel at Colaba waterfront in Mumbai on 3 December 1903 at the cost of 11 million (worth 11 billion in 2015 prices). At that time it was the only hotel in India to have electricity.

In 1885, Tata floated another company in Pondicherry for the sole purpose of distributing Indian textiles to the nearby French Colonies and not having to pay duties; however, this failed due to insufficient demand for the fabrics. This led to his purchase of the Dharamsi Mills at Kurla in Bombay and later reselling it to buy the Advance Mills in Ahmedabad. Tata named it Advance Mills because it was one of the most high-tech mills at the time. On top of its technology, the company left a great effect on the city of Ahmedabad because Tata made an effort to integrate the mill within the city in order to provide economic growth to its community. Through these many contributions, Tata advanced the textile and cotton industry in India. Jamshedji Tata continued to be an important figure in the industrial world even in his later stages of life. Later on, Tata became a strong supporter of Swadeshism.

The Swadeshi Movement did not start until 1905; however, Tata represented these same principles throughout the time he was alive. Swadeshi was a political movement in British India that encouraged the production of domestic goods and the boycott of imported goods. Fully impressed by its principles, Tata named his new cotton mill built in Bombay the "Swadeshi Mill". The original idea for this new mill was to produce finer cloth, like the type coming from Manchester. Manchester was famous for producing softer cloth, and the coarse material produced in India was no longer preferred by the public.

Tata wanted to produce cloth of quality comparable with that of Manchester cloth in an attempt to reduce the number of imports coming from abroad. He had a vision for India to be the primary manufacturer of all kinds of cloth and eventually become an exporter. He wanted India to be the sole maker of the fine cloths for which the primitive weavers of India were famous. Tata started to experiment with various ways to improve the cultivation of cotton grown in different parts of India. He believed that adopting the method of cultivation used by the Egyptian ryot, who were famous for their soft cotton would allow for the cotton industry of India to reach these goals. Tata was the first to introduce the ring spindle into his mills, which soon replaced the throstle that was once used by manufacturers.

His successors' work led to the three remaining ideas being achieved:

Tata Steel (formerly TISCO – Tata Iron and Steel Company Limited) is Asia's first and India's largest steel company. It became the world's fifth-largest steel company after it acquired Corus Group producing 28 million tonnes of steel annually.
Indian Institute of Science, Bengaluru, the pre-eminent Indian institution for research and education in Science and Engineering.
Tata Hydroelectric Power Supply Company, renamed Tata Power Company Limited, currently India's largest private electricity company with an installed generation capacity of over 8000MW.

Philanthropy 
Jamshedji donated generously mainly for education and healthcare. He was named the greatest philanthrope of the last century by EdelGive Foundation and Hurun Research India. He topped the list of the world's top philanthropists of the 20th century with an estimated donation of $102 billion adjusted for inflation.

Personal life 
Tata married Hirabai Daboo. Their sons, Dorabji Tata and Ratanji Tata, succeeded Tata as the chairmen of the Tata Group.

Tata's first cousin was Ratanji Dadabhoy Tata, who played an important role in the establishment of Tata Group. His sister Jerbai, through marriage to a Mumbai merchant, became the mother of Shapurji Saklatvala, who Tata employed to successfully prospect for coal and iron ore in Odisha and Bihar. Saklatvala later settled in England, initially to manage Tata's Manchester office, and later became a Communist Member of the British Parliament.

Through his cousin, Ratanji Dadabhoy, he was the uncle of entrepreneur J. R. D. Tata and Sylla Tata; the latter was married to Dinshaw Maneckji Petit, the third baronet of Petits. The baronet's sister Rattanbai Petit, was the wife of Muhammad Ali Jinnah, the founder of Pakistan.

Death 

While on a business trip to Germany in 1900, Tata became seriously ill. He died in Bad Nauheim on 19 May 1904, and was buried in the Parsi burial ground in Brookwood Cemetery, Woking, England.

Legacy 

Tata's iron and steel plant was set up at Sakchi village in Jharkhand. The village grew into a town and the railway station there was named Tatanagar. Now, it is a bustling metropolis known as Jamshedpur in Jharkhand, named in his honour.
The old village of Sakchi (now urbanised) now exists within the city of Jamshedpur
Tata became the founding member of the Tata family.

Quotes 

"Freedom without the strength to support it and, if need be, defend it, would be a cruel delusion. 

"In a free enterprise, the community is not just another stakeholder in business, but, is in fact, the very purpose of its existence."

"There is one kind of charity common enough among us... It is that patchwork philanthropy which clothes the ragged, feeds the poor, and heals the sick. I am far from decrying the noble spirit which seeks to help a poor or suffering fellow being... [However] what advances a nation or a community is not so much to prop up its weakest and most helpless members but to lift up the best and the most gifted, so as to make them of the greatest service to the country."

"Be sure to lay wide streets planted with shady trees, every other of a quick-growing variety. Be sure that there is plenty of space for lawns and gardens. Reserve large areas for football, hockey and parks. Earmark areas for Hindu temples, Mohammedan mosques and Christian churches."
—Tata in a letter to son Dorab about his vision for the township that would eventually become Jamshedpur.

"He was not a man who cared to bask in the public eye. He disliked public gatherings, he did not care for making speeches, his sturdy strength of character prevented from fawning on any man, however great, for he himself was great in his own way, greater than most people realised. He sought no honour and he claimed no privilege, but the advancement of India and her myriad peoples was with him an abiding passion."
—The Times of India on Tata's death

"While many others worked on loosening the chains of slavery and hastening the march towards the dawn of freedom, Tata dreamed of and worked for life as it was to be fashioned after liberation. Most of the others worked for freedom from a bad life of servitude; Tata worked for freedom for fashioning a better life of economic independence."
—Dr Zakir Hussain, the former president of India

"That he was a man of destiny is clear. It would seem, indeed, as if the hour of his birth, his life, his talents, his actions, the chain of events which he set in motion or influenced, and the services he rendered to his country and to his people, were all pre-destined as part of the greater destiny of India."
—J. R. D. Tata

"No Indian of the present generation had done more for the commerce and industry of India."
—Lord Curzon, the viceroy of India, following Tata's demise

References

Further reading 
 
 n

External links

 
 
 Profile at Tata Group 
 "Jamsetji Nusserwanji Tata A Centenary Tribute", EPW, www.epw.org.

1839 births
1904 deaths
Jamsetji
People from Jamshedpur
Businesspeople from Gujarat
Taj Hotels Resorts and Palaces
Indian businesspeople in textiles
Indian industrialists
Indian company founders
Founders of Indian schools and colleges
Steel industry of India
Elphinstone College alumni
Parsi people
Indian emigrants to Germany
Indian Zoroastrians
Burials at Brookwood Cemetery
Industrial history of India
19th-century Indian businesspeople
20th-century Indian businesspeople